Franklin Prestage was a British-Indian railway engineer who made major contributions to the construction of the Darjeeling Himalayan Railway.

Life 

He was born in London, but lived the major part of his life in British India. He was born in 1830 to Thomas Prestage and Augusta Wilson.  He was married to Eliza Cary and had eight children. He died in 1897.

Education 

He trained as an engineer.

Career 

He was an agent of the Eastern Bengal Railway. He also served as a member of the Legislative Council of Bengal.

Darjeeling Himalayan Railway 

In 1878, Franklin Prestage proposed the construction of the Darjeeling Himalayan Railway. He played a major role in its subsequent completion and realization.

References

External links

 Official Biography

1830 births
1897 deaths
19th-century Indian engineers